Suvarnabhumi Station is a rapid transit station on the Airport Rail Link. It serves the Suvarnabhumi Airport, Thailand, and is integrated with the passenger terminal. The station was opened in August 2010. It is also the easternmost rapid transit station in Bangkok at the present.

Future Eastern HSR 
The station is also considered as part of the High-Speed Rail Linking Three Airports Project that connects between Don Mueang International Airport and U-Tapao International Airport which use Airport Rail Link tracks.

Layout
North ↔ South

Service time 

Note: Express Line is out of operation now.

References

External links
 SRT Airport Rail Link official website 
 Suvarnabhumi Airport Rail Link up to date site with timetables 

Airport Rail Link (Bangkok) stations
Airport railway stations in Thailand
Railway stations opened in 2010
2010 establishments in Thailand
Buildings and structures in Samut Prakan province